Linda Porter may refer to:

Linda Porter (actress) (1933–2019), American character actress
Linda Porter (historian) (born 1947), English historian and biographer
Linda Lee Thomas (1883–1954), married name Linda Porter, wife of Cole Porter